The Gum languages are a small group of closely related languages in New Guinea.

The languages are:
Amele
Central Gum: Bau, Gumalu, Sihan
North Gum: Isebe, Panim

References

 
Languages of Papua New Guinea
Mabuso languages